Hey, Hey, It's the Monkees is a one-hour comedy special televised on the ABC Network on Monday February 17, 1997. The show features all four of the original Monkees and was the last time Micky Dolenz, Davy Jones, Michael Nesmith, and Peter Tork appeared together in a new television program. Michael Nesmith wrote and directed the program.

This special is not to be confused with the similarly titled documentary from 1997, Hey, Hey, We're the Monkees.

Overview
Based on the conceit that the group had never stopped filming episodes of their television series (despite having no place to air them since the series was cancelled), the special shows the now-middle-aged Monkees trying to come up with a new plot (apparently they have all been done by now) while still trying to catch their big break. Much of the music featured in the special came from the quartet's 1996 album Justus, along with a medley of their hits from the 1960s. As of November 2022, it has not been made available on DVD or Blu-ray.

Game show host Chuck Woolery makes a cameo.

Plot
While Davy tries to get the band to rehearse for a very important gig, Micky seeks to find a gimmick to give them an identity, and Mike debates the necessity for anything other than just hanging out together. Various potential story lines present themselves, but each time the Monkees are quick to point out that they have already used that plot line in a previous episode and do not want to do it again.

Several musical sequences and comedy sketches are included.

Development

The project began when ABC approached Monkees manager Ward Sylvester in November, 1996 about producing a Monkees retrospective. Sylvester countered with the idea of doing a special in the format of an episode from the original series. Post production delays caused the final print to be delivered too late for advanced screening, but the marketing push included ads run during some of ABC's most popular shows at the time.

References

External links
 

The Monkees
Music television specials
American Broadcasting Company television specials
1997 television specials